Lee Soo-young (Hangul: 이수영; born Lee Ji-yeon, Hangul: 이지연 on April 12, 1979) is a South Korean ballad singer. She debuted in 1999 with the hit album, I Believe, and quickly gained popularity due to her strong singing skills. During the mid-2000s, Lee was one of South Korea's best-selling singers, selling more than 700,000 albums in 2004 alone despite a recession in the music industry at the time.

Career 
In 2001, she sang the official Korean version of the Final Fantasy X song “Suteki Da Ne” in Korean, titled “얼마나 좋을까” (“Eolmana Joheulkka”).

She released her seventh album, Grace, on January 21, 2006. It performed very well, able to shoot straight to the top of the charts. The popularity of the album led to a limited edition (repackage) release of Grace, of which only 30,000 copies were produced.

Lee has performed the new song written by her titled "Lavender" from her new album at the wedding ceremony of her close friend, Park Kyung-lim, Kim Yoo-mi, Seo Min-jung.

Personal life 
Lee married her boyfriend of one year in October 2010. They have one son, who was born in July 2011.

Discography

Studio albums

Live and compilation albums

Extended plays
 [2008.11.13] Once

Singles
 [2004.06.23] "Saigo no Wagamama" (最後のわがまま / The Final Indulgence)
 [2012.10.10] "Nice Girl" (착한 여자) (The Innocent Man OST)
 [2013.06.11] "Will It Reach You" (닿을수 있나요) (Jang Ok-jung, Living by Love OST Part.6)
 [2014.04.11] "Love in Memory 2" (Love in Memory 2 (To My Dearest) OST Part.2)
 [2013.06.11] "Salang Moshae" (사랑 못해 / I can't love you) (My Only One OST Part.26)
 [2020.03.03] "Find Me"
 [2022.06.02] "The Expression of Time" (구필수는 없다) (Never Give Up OST Part 9) 

 TV series 
 The Accidental Couple (KBS2, 2009) as Jo Seung-eun

 Movies 
 The Quiz Show Scandal'' (2010) as the radio singer

Variety show

Awards 
2003 MBC Top 10 Gayo Festival: Daesang
 2002 Mnet Asian Music Awards - Best Ballad Performance
 2003 Mnet Asian Music Awards - Best Female Solo
 2004 Mnet Asian Music Awards - Best Female Video
2004 Golden Disk Awards: Daesang
2004 MBC Top 10 Gayo Festival: Daesang

References

External links 

  

Grand Prize Golden Disc Award recipients
South Korean women pop singers
South Korean television actresses
Singers from Seoul
1979 births
South Korean female idols
Living people
MAMA Award winners
21st-century South Korean singers
21st-century South Korean women singers